Chubdar-e Olya (also Romanized as Chūbdar-e ‘Olyā; also known as Chūbdār Bālā and Chūbdār-e Bālā) is a village in Zhan Rural District, in the Central District of Dorud County, Lorestan Province, Iran. At the 2006 census, its population was 135, in 29 families.

References 

Towns and villages in Dorud County